A Grand Griffon Vendéen is a breed of hunting dog originating in France. It was the first of the Vendée griffons to be bred from the Greffier whose lineage dates back to the 16th Century. There are also several other breeds of Griffons from Vendée, all of them smaller: the Briquet Griffon Vendéen, and the Grand and Petit Basset Griffon Vendéen.  Related Griffon breeds include the Griffon Fauve de Bretagne, the Griffon Bleu de Gascogne and the Griffon Nivernais.

See also
 Dogs portal
 List of dog breeds

References

External links
Club du Griffon Vendéen - In French

Dog breeds originating in France
FCI breeds
Scent hounds